Ernesto Borel (1 January 1889 – 5 October 1951), was an Italian professional footballer who played as a forward.

As a footballer, Borel first played for Juventus and was the first Juve player to score in the Derby della Mole. On 14 November 1909, Borel scored a brace for Juve in a 2–0 win in the first ever Derby d'Italia. He briefly played in France with AS Cannes, before returning to Italy with A.S.D. La Biellese.

Personal life
Ernesto was the father of Aldo, and 1934 FIFA World Cup winner Felice Borel, who were both professional footballers who played for Juventus.

References

External links
 MyJuve Profile

1889 births
1951 deaths
Footballers from Turin
Italian footballers
Serie A players
Juventus F.C. players
AS Cannes players
Association football forwards
Italian expatriate footballers
Italian expatriate sportspeople in France
Expatriate footballers in France
A.S.D. La Biellese players